Danowo may refer to the following places:
Danowo, Gmina Rajgród in Podlaskie Voivodeship (north-east Poland)
Danowo, Gmina Szczuczyn in Podlaskie Voivodeship (north-east Poland)
Danowo, Kolno County in Podlaskie Voivodeship (north-east Poland)
Danowo, Giżycko County in Warmian-Masurian Voivodeship (north Poland)
Danowo, Pisz County in Warmian-Masurian Voivodeship (north Poland)
Danowo, West Pomeranian Voivodeship (north-west Poland)